Martin Blank (5 February 1897 – 11 March 1972) was a German politician of the Free Democratic Party (FDP) and former member of the German Bundestag.

Life 
Blank had been a member of the German Bundestag since the first federal election in 1949 until 1957. From 1953 until he left the party, he was Parliamentary Secretary of the FDP parliamentary group. From 16 July 1952 to 29 October 1957 Blank was also a member of the European Parliament, where he was chairman of the Committee on Budget and Administration.

Literature

References

1897 births
1972 deaths
Members of the Bundestag for North Rhine-Westphalia
Members of the Bundestag 1953–1957
Members of the Bundestag 1949–1953
Members of the Bundestag for the Free Democratic Party (Germany)
MEPs for Germany 1958–1979
Free Democratic Party (Germany) MEPs